Thomas John Volgy (born March 19, 1946) is a Professor of Political Science at the University of Arizona, where he has been on faculty since 1971. He is also the Executive Director (since 1995) of the International Studies Association.

He is a former member of the Tucson, Arizona City Council (1977–1987) and was Mayor of Tucson 1987-1991. In the United States House of Representatives elections, 1998 he was the Democratic Party's candidate in Arizona's 5th congressional district.

He is a graduate of Oakland University (BA) and the University of Minnesota (MA and PhD).

Books
 John E. Schwartz and Thomas J. Volgy (1993), The Forgotten Americans, W. W. Norton
 Thomas J. Volgy (2001), Politics in the Trenches: Citizens, Politicians, and the Fate of Democracy, University of Arizona Press
 Thomas Volgy et al. (2009), Mapping the New World Order, Wiley-Blackwell
 Volgy, Thomas J., Renato Corbetta, Keith A. Grant, and Ryan G. Baird (eds.) 2011. Major Powers and the Quest for Status in International Politics. Palgrave/MacMillan.

See also
2003 Tucson mayoral election

References

External links
 Volgy's bio at University of Arizona

Living people
Arizona city council members
Arizona Democrats
University of Arizona faculty
Oakland University alumni
University of Minnesota alumni
Mayors of Tucson, Arizona
1946 births
Hungarian emigrants to the United States